Nilesat 102 is an Egyptian owned geosynchronous communications satellite that was launched by an Ariane 44LP rocket from Kourou, French Guiana on August 17, 2000, at 23:16 UTC by the European Space Agency. It was manufactured by the European company Matra Marconi Space (Astrium), and started official broadcasting on 12 September 2000 with an expected lifetime of 15 years. The spacecraft weighed 1,827 kg at launch.

Manufacture 
It was manufactured by the European company Matra Marconi Space (Astrium). At launch, the spacecraft weighed 1,827 kg (fully fuelled). The receiver dish diameter is 50 cm to 75 cm. The transponder output power is 100 W and 12 Ku-band transponders with a bandwidth of 33 MHz. The maximum power consumption is 3.06 kW. The satellite utilizes a three axis stabilization system. The satellite is powered by two deployable solar arrays, with the power being stored on batteries.

Launch 
Nilesat 102 was launched by an Ariane 44LP rocket from Kourou, French Guiana on August 17, 2000, at 23:16 UTC by the European Space Agency.

Mission

Operations 
Nilesat 102 is operated by the Egyptian satellite Co. Nilesat, which was established in 1996 with the purpose of operating Egyptian satellites and their associated mission control center and ground stations. The two control centers are located in Cairo and Alexandria.

The two satellites carried more than 150 TV channels, adding 50 more channels than when only Nilesat 101 was operational. Additional services provided include data transmission, turbo internet, and multicasting operations.

End of Mission 

NileSat 102 was retired in June 2018 and moved to a graveyard orbit.

References

https://space.skyrocket.de/doc_sdat/nilesat-101.htm

External links 

 

Nilesat 102 at International Media Switzerland

Communications satellites in geostationary orbit
Spacecraft launched in 2000
Satellites of Egypt
2000 in Egypt
Telecommunications in Egypt
Satellites using the Eurostar bus